Number 1 seeds Philipp Marx and Igor Zelenay won 6–4, 7–5 in the final against the No. 2 seeds, twins Sanchai and Sonchat Ratiwatana.

Seeds

Draw

Draw

References
 Doubles Draw

ATP Salzburg Indoors - Doubles
ATP Salzburg Indoors